Gorokhovka is a rural locality (a selo) in Shchuchinskoye Rural Settlement, Ertilsky District, Voronezh Oblast, Russia. The population was 122 as of 2010. There are 4 streets.

Geography 
Gorokhovka is located on the right bank of the Bityug River, 36 km west of Ertil (the district's administrative centre) by road. Stary Ertil is the nearest rural locality.

References 

Rural localities in Ertilsky District